William B. Martin (March 17, 1846 – June 11, 1916) was an American businessman and politician.

Born in Rochester, Vermont, Martin went to public school in Orange County, Vermont. He tried to enlisted in the 4th Vermont Infantry during the American Civil War and was rejected because he was sixteen years old. In 1869, Martin moved to Adair County, Iowa and settled in Greenfield, Iowa. He open a real estate and loan business in Greenfield. Martin served as mayor of Greenfiels and on the Greenfield City Council. He also served as county auditor for Adair County and was a Republican. From 1894 to 1898, Marti served in the Iowa House of Representatives. Then, from 1901 to 1907, Martin served as Iowa Secretary of State. Martin died at his home in Des Moines, Iowa.

Notes

1846 births
1916 deaths
People from Rochester, Vermont
People of Vermont in the American Civil War
People from Greenfield, Iowa
Businesspeople from Iowa
Iowa city council members
Mayors of places in Iowa
Secretaries of State of Iowa
Republican Party members of the Iowa House of Representatives
19th-century American businesspeople